Notre-Dame de Lourdes Church is a modernist Catholic church in Casablanca, Morocco. It was built in 1954 by architect Achille Dangleterre and engineer Gaston Zimmer. The main attraction of Notre-Dame de Lourdes church is the glasswork of world-famous stained glass artist Gabriel Loire. Its also long concrete entrance is also noteworthy.

Stained glass

References 

Churches in Morocco
Modernist architecture
20th-century Roman Catholic church buildings
20th-century architecture in Morocco
Religious buildings and structures in Casablanca